Adult Contemporary is a chart published by Billboard ranking the top-performing songs in the United States in the adult contemporary music (AC) market.  In 1977, 20 songs topped the chart, then published under the title Easy Listening, based on playlists submitted by radio stations.

The three longest-running chart-toppers of the year were all taken from film soundtracks.  Carly Simon had the year's longest run in the top spot, spending seven weeks at number one with "Nobody Does It Better", the theme song from the James Bond film The Spy Who Loved Me.  Both "How Deep Is Your Love" by the Bee Gees, from the soundtrack to Saturday Night Fever, and "Evergreen (Love Theme from A Star Is Born)" by Barbra Streisand spent six weeks atop the chart.  Streisand's other number one of 1977, "My Heart Belongs to Me", had also been written for the film A Star Is Born but was ultimately not used, and was instead included on her album Superman.  Debby Boone's November number one "You Light Up My Life" was a recording of a song from the film of the same name, released in the same year.  Although the song was sung in the film by Kasey Cisyk, Boone was brought in to record a new vocal over the existing instrumental backing track and this was the version that became a hit.  The song spent a record-breaking ten weeks at number one on Billboards all-genres chart, the Hot 100, but only spent a single week atop the Easy Listening chart.

In addition to "You Light Up My Life", several of 1977's other Easy Listening number ones had sufficient crossover success to also top Billboards all-genres chart, the Hot 100, including songs by Mary McGregor, Leo Sayer, David Soul, Barbra Streisand, Barry Manilow and the Bee Gees.  "Southern Nights" by Glen Campbell was a  triple chart-topper, as in addition to topping both the Easy Listening chart and the Hot 100, it also reached the top spot on the Hot Country Songs listing.  Barbra Streisand's total of ten weeks at number one on the Easy Listening listing was the most for any artist in 1977.  She was one of only three artists with more than one chart-topper during the year, the others being Glen Campbell, who spent four non-consecutive weeks in the top spot with "Southern Nights" and one week with "Sunflower", and Barry Manilow, who topped the listing for a single week with "Weekend in New England" and a further three with "Looks Like We Made It".  The year ended with "How Deep Is Your Love" by the Bee Gees holding the top spot.

Chart history

References

See also
1977 in music
List of artists who reached number one on the U.S. Adult Contemporary chart

1977
1977 record charts